The Extraordinary and Plenipotentiary Ambassador of Peru to the Czech Republic is the official representative of the Republic of Peru to the Czech Republic.

Peru first established relations with Czechoslovakia on July 11, 1922. In 1937, the diplomatic representation between both countries was raised to the level of Embassy, with the latter opening an embassy in Lima the same year.

After the German occupation of Czechoslovakia—now the Protectorate of Bohemia and Moravia—Peru ceased to recognize Czechoslovakia as a sovereign state. However, as World War II progressed, Peru maintained relations with the Czechoslovak government-in-exile, among others, now based in London.

After the war, both countries reestablished relations, which continued into the Czechoslovak Socialist Republic until October 4, 1957, when Peru, under Manuel A. Odría's government, broke relations with the state. After the 1968 Peruvian coup d'état and the establishment of Juan Velasco Alvarado's Revolutionary Government, relations were renewed in 1968 and raised to the level of embassy in 1969.

Relations again continued into the Czech and Slovak Federative Republic, and after the country ceased to exist in 1993, the Peruvian government recognized the Czech Republic and Slovakia as its successor states. As of 2023, Peru maintains an embassy in Prague, and the ambassador in Vienna is accredited to Slovakia.

List of representatives

Czechoslovakia (1922–1993)

Czech Republic (1993–present)

See also
List of ambassadors of Peru to the Soviet Union
List of ambassadors of Peru to East Germany
List of ambassadors of Peru to Yugoslavia
List of ambassadors of Peru to Bulgaria
List of ambassadors of Peru to Albania
List of ambassadors of Peru to Hungary
List of ambassadors of Peru to Romania
List of ambassadors of Peru to Poland

References

Czech Republic
Peru